Tomas Hradecký (born 13 October 1992) is a Finnish professional footballer who plays for PIF, as a midfielder. He is of Slovak descent. He is the brother of Lukáš Hrádecký and Matej Hradecky.

References

1992 births
Living people
Footballers from Turku
Finnish footballers
Turun Palloseura footballers
Åbo IFK players
Salon Palloilijat players
IFK Mariehamn players
Rovaniemen Palloseura players
FC Santa Claus players
Bohemians 1905 players
Seinäjoen Jalkapallokerho players
Veikkausliiga players
Ykkönen players
Kakkonen players
Czech First League players
Association football midfielders
Finnish expatriate footballers
Finnish expatriate sportspeople in the Czech Republic
Expatriate footballers in the Czech Republic
Finnish people of Slovak descent
Pargas Idrottsförening players